Mohammad Fotouhi (born 5 December 1990) is an Iranian fencer. He competed in the Men's team sabre events at the 2020 Summer Olympics in Tokyo 2021 (played against U.S. sabre team).

References

External links
 

1990 births
Living people
People from Yazd
Iranian male sabre fencers
Fencers at the 2020 Summer Olympics
Olympic fencers of Iran
Universiade bronze medalists for Iran
Medalists at the 2017 Summer Universiade
Universiade silver medalists for Iran
Universiade medalists in fencing